SCK may refer to:

SCK•CEN: The Belgian nuclear research institute
The IATA airport code for the Stockton Metropolitan Airport
Seeclub Kuesnacht
Serial Clock of a digital electronics device, see Clock signal